RCO Agde is a French football club. The club is based at the 3500-seat Stade Louis Sanguin in Agde.

RCO Agde was created in 1999 from the merger of Racing Club Agathois (founded 1904) and Football Olympique Agathois. As of the 2019–20 season, the club's senior team plays in the Championnat National 3. The club colours are red and black.

Honours
 DH Languedoc Group: 1991
 DH Mediterranean Group runners-up: 1950, 1972

External links
RCO Agde club profile at Footballdatabase.eu
RCO Agde club profile at Foot-national.com

1999 establishments in France
Association football clubs established in 1999
Football clubs in Occitania (administrative region)
Sport in Hérault